Signals Midwest is an American punk rock band from Cleveland, Ohio.

History
Signals Midwest formed in 2008. In 2009, the band self-released their first full-length album titled Burn the Blueprints. In 2011, the band released their second full-length album titled Latitudes and Longitudes after signing with the record label Tiny Engines. Also in 2011, the band released a split with Shady Ave. In 2013, the band released their third studio album and second with Tiny Engines titled Light on the Lake. In 2016, Signals Midwest released their fourth full-length album and third with Tiny Engines titled At This Age. On June 19, 2019 Signals Midwest premiered the track, “Your New Old Apartment,” off their forthcoming record Pin, which was released on August 2 via Lauren Records. On April 8, 2022 their 5th full length album "Dent" was released on Lauren Records.

Band members
Current members
Max Stern - lead vocals, guitar 
Ryan Williamson - bass 
Jeff Russell - guitar
Steve Gibson - drums, backing vocals

Former members
Loren Shumaker - bass

Discography
Studio albums
Burn the Blueprints (2009)
Latitudes and Longitudes (2011)
Light on the Lake (2013)
At This Age (2016)
DENT (2022)

EPs
Signals Midwest/Shady Ave. Split 7" (2011)
French Exit/Signals Midwest Split 7" (2012)
Signals Midwest/Worship This! Split 7" (2013)
Wherever I Might Land (2014)
Pin (2019)

References

Musical groups from Cleveland
Musical groups established in 2009
Punk rock groups from Ohio
Tiny Engines artists